Friedrich Anton Maria Hubertus Bonifacius Graf von Ledebur-Wicheln ( – ) was an Austrian actor who was known for Moby Dick (1956), Alexander the Great (1955) and Slaughterhouse-Five (1972).

Early life
Ledebur was born in Nisko, Austro-Hungarian Empire  (now Poland) in 1900. Friedrich enlisted in the Austro-Hungarian Army in 1916, and was an officer in the Austrian Cavalry Division during the last years of World War I.

Interwar period
In the 1930s Ledebur became a close friend of Charles Bedaux, with whom he traveled extensively in Africa and Canada. After the war, Ledebur spent the next two decades travelling the world, working all manner of odd jobs from gold mining to deep sea diving, to riding and winning prize money at rodeos. Ledebur settled in the United States in 1939 and anglicised his name to 'Frederick'. A close friendship with fellow adventurer and director John Huston, gave Ledebur his entrée to character acting.

Acting career

In 1945, von Ledebur made his film debut. He later appeared in Alexander the Great (1955), and played chief harpooneer Queequeg, a South Sea chieftain, in the film Moby Dick (1956). "Better a sober cannibal than a drunken Christian", Herman Melville's Ishmael famously says of Queequeg in the book and the film. He appeared as Brother Christophorus in The Twilight Zone episode "The Howling Man".

Selected filmography

 A Royal Scandal (1945) - Russian General (uncredited)
 Notorious (1946) - Knerr (uncredited)
 Forever Amber (1947) - Cavalier (uncredited)
 My Girl Tisa (1948) - Igor (uncredited)
 Mr. Blandings Builds His Dream House (1948) - Workman (uncredited)
 The Great Sinner (1949) - Casino Secretary
 Moulin Rouge (1952) - Maitre d'Hotel at Maxim's (uncredited)
 Alexander the Great (1956) - Antipater
 Moby Dick (1956) - Queequeg
 Voodoo Island (1957) - Native Chief
 The Man Who Turned to Stone (1957) - Eric
 The 27th Day (1957) - Dr. Karl Neuhaus
 The Brothers Karamazov (1958) - Chief Judge (uncredited)
 Crash Landing (1958) - Priest (uncredited)
 Fräulein (1958) - German Police Captain (uncredited)
 The Roots of Heaven (1958) - Peer Qvist
 Enchanted Island (1958) - Mehevi
 The Buccaneer (1958) - Capt. Bart
 A Breath of Scandal (1960) - Count Sandor
 Barabbas (1961) - Officer
 Freud: The Secret Passion (1962) - (uncredited)
 The Fall of the Roman Empire (1964) - Barbarian (uncredited)
 The Shoot (1964) - Mübarek
 The Treasure of the Aztecs (1965) - Count Don Fernando di Rodriganda y Sevilla
 Juliet of the Spirits (1965) - Medium
 The Blue Max (1966) - Feldmarschall von Lenndorf
 Il Natale che quasi non fu (1967) - (uncredited)
 Reflections in a Golden Eye (1967) - Lieutenant at Garden Party (uncredited)
 Assignment K (1968) - Ski Shop Proprietor (uncredited)
 Oedipus the King (1968) - King Laius
 Mayerling (1968) - Hofmarschall (uncredited)
 Kampf um Rom (1968) - Hildebrand
 The Christmas Tree (1969) - Vernet
 Slaughterhouse-Five (1972) - German Leader
 Ludwig (1973) - Hofmarschall (uncredited)
 A Genius, Two Partners and a Dupe (1975) - Don Felipe, the priest
  (1976) - Martin Ross
 The Standard (1977) - General
 Sorcerer (1977) - 'Carlos'
 Bloodline (1979) - Innkeeper
 Ginger and Fred (1986) - Admiral Aulenti (final film role)

References

External links
 
 

1900 births
1986 deaths
Austrian male film actors
Austrian male television actors
Austro-Hungarian military personnel of World War I
Austro-Hungarian Army officers
People from Nisko
20th-century Austrian male actors
Austrian expatriates in the United States